Bösiger is a surname. Notable people with the surname include:

Johannes Bösiger, Swiss/German scriptwriter and producer
Jonas Bösiger (born 1995), Swiss snowboarder
Max Bösiger (born 1933), Swiss boxer
 (1929–1977), Swiss actor, refer